The 2020–21 Kansas State Wildcats women's basketball team represented Kansas State University in the 2020–21 NCAA Division I women's basketball season. The Wildcats were led by seventh-year head coach Jeff Mittie. They played their home games at Bramlage Coliseum in Manhattan, Kansas and were members of the Big 12 Conference. 

They finished the season 9–18, 3–15 in Big 12 play to finish in a tie for ninth place. As the tenth seed in the he Big 12 Tournament the defeated Texas Tech in the First Round before losing to West Virginia in the Quarterfinals. They were not invited to the NCAA tournament or the WNIT.

Previous season

The Wildcats finished the season 16–13, 10–8 in Big 12 play to finish in a tie for fourth place. They were scheduled to be the fifth seed in the he Big 12 Tournament, but it was cancelled before it began due to the COVID-19 pandemic.  The NCAA women's basketball tournament and WNIT were also canceled.

Roster

Schedule and results 

Source:

|-
!colspan=6 style=| Exhibition

|-
!colspan=6 style=| Non-conference regular season

|-
!colspan=6 style=| Big 12 regular season

|-
!colspan=6 style=| Big 12 Women's Tournament

Rankings

The Coaches Poll did not release a Week 2 poll and the AP Poll did not release a poll after the NCAA Tournament.

See also 
 2020–21 Kansas State Wildcats men's basketball team

References 

Kansas State Wildcats women's basketball seasons
Kansas State
2021 in sports in Kansas
2020 in sports in Kansas